Quiroga is a neighbourhood (barrio) of Bogotá, Colombia.

Neighbourhoods of Bogotá